
Saint Jago Women's Centre has been closed, making Fort Augusta the only women's prison on the island.

See also

List of prisons in Jamaica

External links
Aerial view.
Photos:

References

Prisons in Jamaica
Women's prisons in Jamaica
Buildings and structures in Saint Catherine Parish
Spanish Town